South Korea–Ukraine relations are foreign relations between South Korea and Ukraine. Diplomatic Relations were established on February 10, 1992. South Korea has an embassy in Kyiv. Ukraine has an embassy in Seoul.

Ukraine recognizes the Republic of Korea as the sole legitimate government in the Korean Peninsula since 13 July 2022, after breaking diplomatic relations with North Korea over its recognition of Luhansk and Donetsk.

Following Russian invasion of Ukraine, Ukraine asked South Korea for aid. South Korea has provided Ukraine with some resources, but refused to provide it with lethal weaponry.

See also 
 Foreign relations of South Korea
 Foreign relations of Ukraine

References

External links 
  Korean Ministry of Foreign Affairs and Trade about relations with Ukraine
  Korean embassy in Kyiv
  Ukrainian embassy in Seoul

 
Ukraine
Korea, South